Benjamín Gallegos Soto (22 April 1960 – 27 November 2018) was a Mexican politician affiliated with the National Action Party. He served as Senator of the LVIII and LIX Legislatures representing Aguascalientes and as Deputy of the LVII Legislature.

References

1960 births
2018 deaths
People from Calvillo Municipality
National Action Party (Mexico) politicians
Members of the Senate of the Republic (Mexico)
Members of the Chamber of Deputies (Mexico)
21st-century Mexican politicians